The 2023 Real Salt Lake season will be the team's 19th season in Major League Soccer, the top division of the American soccer pyramid. The team will also compete in both the 2023 U.S. Open Cup and 2023 Leagues Cup. Real Salt Lake will play their home games at America First Field in the Salt Lake City suburb of Sandy, and managed by Pablo Mastroeni in his second full season with the club.

Club

Roster

,

Transfers
'

In

Out

Loans

In

Out

Competitions

Preseason

MLS regular season

Matches

Standings

Western Conference table

Overall table

Results summary

Leagues Cup 

The Leagues Cup will occur between July 21 and August 19, with all MLS teams competing and regular season play being suspended. Real Salt Lake will enter in the group stage as a seeded team, based on 2022 standings.

West 2

U.S. Open Cup 

Real Salt Lake will enter the Open Cup in the Third Round, based on 2022 standings.

Statistics

Squad appearances
As of March 6, 2023

Goals
Stats from the MLS regular season, MLS playoffs, Leagues Cup, and U.S. Open Cup are all included.
First tie-breaker for goals is assists.

Assists
Stats from the MLS regular season, MLS playoffs, Leagues Cup, and U.S. Open Cup are all included.
First tie-breaker for assists is minutes played.

Shutouts
Stats from the MLS regular season, MLS playoffs, Leagues Cup, and U.S. Open Cup are all included.
First tie-breaker for shutouts is minutes played.

References

Real Salt Lake seasons
Real Salt Lake
Real Salt
Real Salt